The Tasmanian Open is an annual golf tournament held in Tasmania, Australia.

History
The Tasmanian amateur championship was first played in 1902 as a 36 hole stroke-play event. From 1910 the stroke-play acted as qualifying for a match-play stage, with the leading four players qualifying. In 1913 the 36 hole stroke-play event was opened up to professionals as well as amateurs and the winner became the Tasmanian Open champion. The first winner was an amateur, Eustace Headlam. This was the only event before World War I, the championship being revived in 1919 and was again won by Headlam. There was no Open championship between 1923 and 1929, the event again being restricted to amateurs. The 1922 Open was won by Robert Nettlefold and when it restarted in 1930 it was won by his son, Len Nettlefold, with Jock Robertson, the Kingston Beach professional, the runner-up. Len Nettlefold won the event 7 times in 8 years and won for an eighth time in 1947. In 1938 Alf Toogood, Jock Robertson's successor at Kingston Beach, became the first professional winner and he was followed by Denis Denehey in 1939.

After World War II, amateurs continued to be successful, including 19-year-old Peter Toogood, the son of Alf Toogood, in 1949. Alf himself won the following year, 1950, pushing Peter into second place. Peter Toogood won again in 1951 and would win every year from 1954 to 1959, matching Len Nettlefold's record of 8 championships. The Open was expanded to 72 holes in 1953. Ron Smith, an amateur from Victoria, won with 60-year-old Alf Toogood one of the runners-up.

In 1961, a small group of New South Wales professionals went on a promotional tour of Tasmania, and played in the Open. One of them, Alan Murray won, with two others, second and third. The following year the Tasmanian government gave a grant towards the Open, and the £1,000 prize money attracted a number of professionals. Frank Phillips and Peter Thomson tied on 279, but there was something of anti-climax since Thomson had assumed that Phillips would win and had left for the mainland, forfeiting the championship to Phillips. The £1,000 prize money continued for a few years, rising to A$10,000 by 1975 and reaching A$100,000 in 1988 and 1989. There had only been three professional wins up to 1960 but from 1961 to 1992 the situation reversed, with only one amateur winner in that period, Max Robison in 1978.

The 1991 event had prize money of A$85,000, failing to meet the minimum requirement for a tour event. After 1992, the event failed to attract leading professionals and there has only been one professional winner since 1992, Simon Hawkes in 2016.

Winners

2022 Samuel Slater (a)
2021 Joshua Fuller (a)
2020 Hayden Hopewell (a)
2019 Aiden Didone (a)
2018 No tournament
2017 Lee Chang-gi (a)
2016 Simon Hawkes
2015 Anthony Quayle (a)
2014 Jarryd Felton (a)
2013 Jordan Zunic (a)
2012 Ricky Kato (a)
2011 Matt Stieger (a)
2010 Jin Jeong (a)
2009 Ryan McCarthy (a)
2008 Tim Stewart (a)
2007 Rohan Blizard (a)
2006 Ben Parker (a)
2005 Ashley Hall (a)
2004 Kevin Chun (a)
2003 Nick Flanagan (a)
2002 Adam Groom (a)
2001 Richard Swift (a)
2000 Andrew Webster (a)
1999 Brendan Jones (a)
1998 Geoff Ogilvy (a)
1997 Cameron Percy (a) (2)
1996 Cameron Percy (a)
1995 Lee Eagleton (a)
1994 Mathew Goggin (a)
1993 David Bransdon (a)

Source:

References

Golf tournaments in Australia
Golf in Tasmania